Adventures of the Seaspray is a 1967 Australian TV series about a widower journalist who travels the Pacific with his children in a sailing boat.

Cast
Dan Wells, skipper of the 'Seaspray' (32 episodes), played by Walter Brown.
Mike Wells, son (33 episodes), played by Gary Gray.
Susan Wells, daughter (33 episodes), played by Susanne Haworth.
Willyum (33 episodes), played by Leone Lesinawai.
Noah Wells, son (9 episodes), played by Rodney Pearlman.
Inspector Dales (2 episodes), played by Paul Stockman.

Background 
Leone Lesinawai, who played Willyum in the series, was the owner of the Seaspray ship that was featured in the series. He leased the boat to the filming company and got the supporting part of Willyum. The Seaspray is now located near Nadi (Fiji Islands) and is used for tourist cruises to neighbouring islands.

References

External links
Adventures of the Seaspray at IMDb
Adventures of the Seaspray at Classic Australian TV
Adventures of the Seaspray at Australian Television

Australian Broadcasting Corporation original programming
1960s Australian drama television series
Australian children's television series
1967 Australian television series debuts
1967 Australian television series endings
Television shows set in Oceania
Television series by Screen Gems
Television series by Sony Pictures Television